The 2018–19 Belgian Third Amateur Division is the third season of the division in its current format, replacing the former Belgian Fourth Division.

Team changes

In
 Bornem, La Calamine, Pepingen-Halle, Sint-Lenaarts, Sprimont Comblain, Tienen, Torhout and Zwarte Leeuw were all relegated from the 2017–18 Belgian Second Amateur Division.
 Lyra-Lierse Berlaar, Helson Helchteren, Zelzate and Zwevezele were promoted as champions of the Flemish Belgian Provincial Leagues, respectively in Antwerp, Limburg, East Flanders and West Flanders.
 Ostiches-Ath, Warnant, Meix-Dt-Virton and Fosses were promoted as champions of the Walloon Belgian Provincial Leagues, respectively in Hainaut, Liège, Luxembourg and Namur.
 CS Braine was promoted as champion of the French speaking teams in the region matching the old Province of Brabant and Brussels.
 Betekom was promoted as champion of the Flemish speaking teams in the region matching the old Province of Brabant and Brussels.
 Racing Mechelen and Oostkamp were promoted through the interprovincial play-offs on VFV side.
 Condruzien, Jette and Symphorinois were promoted through the interprovincial play-offs on ACFF side.
 As top team not yet promoted in Luxembourg, Oppagne-Wéris was awarded a promotion to fill the gap left by Bertrix.
 As top French speaking team not yet promoted in the old Province of Brabant and Brussels, Stockel was awarded a promotion to fill the gap left by WS Brussels, who folded after being relegated from the 2017–18 Belgian Second Amateur Division.

Out
 Menen was promoted after winning the 2017–18 Belgian Third Amateur Division A.
 Heur-Tongeren was promoted after winning the 2017–18 Belgian Third Amateur Division B.
 La Louvière was promoted after winning the 2017–18 Belgian Third Amateur Division C.
 Tilleur was promoted after winning the 2017–18 Belgian Third Amateur Division D.
 Diegem, Dikkelvenne and Eppegem were promoted as winners of the Third Amateur Division promotion play-offs VFV.
 Couvin-Mariembourg, Francs Borains and Visé were promoted as winners of the Third Amateur Division promotion play-offs ACFF.
 Cointe-Liège, Diest, Grimbergen, Habay, Herentals, Hoeilaart, Mariekerke, Ninove, Solre, Spy, Sterrebeek, Vlamertinge and Waterloo were relegated to the Belgian Provincial Leagues.
 Bertrix decided to restart at the bottom level of the Belgian football pyramid due to financial trouble.

Merger
 UR Namur would normally have been relegated from the 2017–18 Belgian Third Amateur Division but merged with newly promoted Fosses to form Union Namur Fosses-La-Ville.
 Royal Sprimont Comblain Sport merged with Royal Football Club Banneux to form Royal Football Comblain Banneux Sprimont.

Name change
 Racing Jet Wavre changed its name to Wavre Sports.

Belgian Third Amateur Division A

League table

Belgian Third Amateur Division B

League table

Belgian Third Amateur Division C

League table

Belgian Third Amateur Division D

League table

Championship matches
Both the two VFV and two ACFF teams winning their leagues can arrange a title match to determine the overall VFV and ACFF champions of the Belgian Third Division. This season, the overall ACFF champion was supposed to be determined over two legs, however Namur forfeited the return match after losing the first leg. On VFV side, Merelbeke and Tienen decided not to play a championship match. There was also no match between the overall VFV and ACFF champions.

Championship match ACFF

First Leg

Second Leg

Namur did not show up for the return match and lost 1-9 on aggregate. Stockay was crowned overall ACFF champion in the Belgian Third Amateur Division.

Promotion play-offs

Promotion play-offs VFV
The teams finishing in second place in the Third Amateur Division A and Third Amateur Division B will take part in a promotion playoff first round together with three period winners from both divisions. These 8 teams from the VFV will play the first round of a promotion-playoff, with two teams promoting to the 2019–20 Belgian Second Amateur Division. Depending on the number of VFV teams relegating from the 2018–19 Belgian First Amateur Division and possible mergers and bankruptcies, more teams might get promoted.

In Division A, Wetteren (2nd place overall) and Zwevezele (won two periods) qualified directly, while Pepingen-Halle and Wingene were awarded a place based on their league finish. In a similar fashion in Division B, Houtvenne (2nd place overall) and Lyra-Lierse (won one period) were joined by Sint-Lenaarts and Betekom.

VFV Round 1

The four winners will continue into the VFV Round 2 to play for the two extra promotion places.

VFV Round 2

Pepingen-Halle and Zwevezele are promoted to the 2019–20 Belgian Second Amateur Division. Lyra-Lierse and Houtvenne moved to the third place match in case extra promotion places become available.

Third place match

By winning, Houtvenne is first in line to promote in case an extra spot opens up.

Promotion play-offs ACFF
The team finishing in second place in the Third Amateur Division C and Third Amateur Division D will take part in a promotion playoff first round together with three period winners from both divisions. These 8 teams from the ACFF will play the first round of a promotion-playoff, with two teams promoting to the 2019–20 Belgian Second Amateur Division although more places could come up which is why the third round also features a match between the losers of the second round.

In Division C, CS Braine won two periods with the other being won by champion Namur Fosses. The three remaining spots were taken by third, fourth and fifth placed teams, respectively Aische, Tournai and Léopold Uccle. In Division D, Givry and Verlaine had each managed to win a period. Richelle and Onhaye also qualified as the two highest finishers.

ACFF Round 1

The four winners moved on to round 2 to contend for promotion, while the losing teams remain in the Belgian Third Amateur Division.

ACFF Round 2
The two winning teams will be promoted to the 2019–20 Belgian Second Amateur Division, the losing teams will play a match to determine third and fourth place in case extra promotion places would come up.

Verlaine and Onhaye won promotion to the 2019–20 Belgian Second Amateur Division. A third team will be promoted in case Visé, playing in the 2018–19 Belgian Second Amateur Division Promotion play-offs, wins promotion to the 2019–20 Belgian First Amateur Division. Therefore, Givry and Tournai will play a third-place match.

Third place match

By winning, Givry was first in line to promote in case an extra available spot. As Visé won promotion to the Belgian First Amateur Division, an extra ACFF team was promoted, resulting in Givry moving up.

Relegation play-offs

ACFF

Due to the results in higher leagues, prior to the match it was certain the winner of this ACFF play-off would avoid relegation. Ganshoren was eventually spared as well.

VFV

At the time of the match, it was yet uncertain whether there would be one or two extra VFV teams relegated from the 2018–19 Belgian Third Amateur Division. Ternesse faced relegation by losing the match, Oostkamp also faced relegation three weeks later as ACFF team Visé got promoted, resulting in an extra team from VFV to be relegated.

References

Belgian Third Amateur Division
Bel
5